Angelique Kerber defeated Serena Williams in the final, 6–3, 6–3 to win the ladies' singles tennis title at the 2018 Wimbledon Championships. It was her third major singles title, and she became the first German to win the title since Steffi Graf in 1996. She lost only one set during the tournament, to Claire Liu in the second round. Williams was attempting to equal Margaret Court's all-time record of 24 major singles titles, and to become the first mother to win a major singles title since Kim Clijsters won the 2011 Australian Open.

Garbiñe Muguruza was the defending champion, but lost in the second round to Alison Van Uytvanck.

Simona Halep, Caroline Wozniacki and Sloane Stephens were in contention for the WTA No. 1 singles ranking. Despite losing in the third round, Halep retained the No. 1 ranking after Wozniacki and Stephens lost in the second and first rounds, respectively.

With each of the top ten seeds losing before the quarterfinals, it was the worst overall Wimbledon performance of the top ten women's seeds in the Open Era. This was also the first time in the Open Era that none of the top four women's singles seeds reached the fourth round at Wimbledon.

Seeds

Qualifying

Draw

Finals

Top half

Section 1

Section 2

Section 3

Section 4

Bottom half

Section 5

Section 6

Section 7

Section 8

Championship match statistics

References

External links
 Women's Singles draw
2018 Wimbledon Championships – Women's draws and results at the International Tennis Federation

Women's Singles
Wimbledon Championship by year – Women's singles